The Phrygian Pentapolis was an area of five cities (Greek pentapolis, "five cities") in ancient Phrygia, now in Turkey. The five cities were:  Eucarpia, Hierapolis, Otrus, Bruzus, and Stectorium.

References

Ancient Greek geography
Geography of Phrygia